Triptych (1982–1989) was an American-bred, Irish-trained Thoroughbred racehorse who won nine top-class races in Europe. She earned over $1.5 million in prize money. Triptych died in a freak accident in 1989 when in foal.

Background
Triptych was a dark bay mare bred in Kentucky by Nelson Bunker Hunt & Edward L. Stevenson. She was sired by Riverman an American-bred French-trained horse who won the Poule d'Essai des Poulains in 1972. As a breeding stallion he was highly successful, being the sire of many important winners including Irish River, Bahri, Gold River, River Memories and Detroit.

She was consigned to the 1983 Keeneland Sales summer yearling auction, where she was purchased for US$2.15 million by an agent for Alan Clore.

Racing career
Triptych ran 41 times and won 18 races; of those, 12 were Pattern races, including nine Group 1 events. She was placed another 19 times, all but one of them in Group 1 races, and her worldwide earnings amounted to more than £1,500,500. Her first big win came in the 1984 Prix Marcel Boussac, when she was trained by David Smaga in France, but she moved to David O'Brien in Ireland for her second season when she became the first filly to win the  Irish 2,000 Guineas at the Curragh, was runner-up in The Oaks to Oh So Sharp and third to Commanche Run  and Oh So Sharp in the Benson and Hedges Gold Cup  (now the International Stakes) at York.

At age four in 1986, Triptych won the Champion Stakes and La Coupe, by which time she had joined Patrick Biancone. She was placed in the King George VI and Queen Elizabeth Stakes, Eclipse Stakes and Prix de l'Arc de Triomphe. In 1987, she won the Coronation Cup (which she also won in 1988), Prix Ganay, Champion Stakes (both English and Irish versions) and International Stakes. She was sent to race in the United States, where she made one start at Churchill Downs in Kentucky and was then retired to broodmare duty on November 7, 1988.

Retirement
Sent to stud in 1989, she died as a result of a freak accident when she ran into a stud farm vehicle. She was in foal to Mr. Prospector at the time.

Pedigree

References

1982 racehorse births
1989 racehorse deaths
Racehorses bred in Kentucky
Racehorses trained in France
Racehorses trained in Ireland
Irish Classic Race winners
Thoroughbred family 4-n